The Scottish Premiership, known as the cinch Premiership for sponsorship reasons, is the top division of the Scottish Professional Football League (SPFL), the league competition for men's professional football clubs in Scotland. The Scottish Premiership was established in July 2013, after the SPFL was formed by a merger of the Scottish Premier League and Scottish Football League. There are 12 teams in this division, with each team playing 38 matches per season. Sixteen clubs have played in the Scottish Premiership since its creation in the 2013–14 season. Celtic are the current league champions, having won the 2021–22 Scottish Premiership.

Competition format
Teams receive three points for a win and one point for a draw. No points are awarded for a loss. Teams are ranked by total points, then goal difference, and then goals scored. At the end of each season, the club with the most points is crowned league champion. If the points, goal difference, goals scored, and head-to-head results between teams are equal, a play-off game held at a neutral venue shall be played to determine the final placings. The play-off will only occur when the position of the teams affects the outcome of the title, European qualification, relegation, or second stage group allocation and shall not occur otherwise.

Split
The top flight of Scottish football has contained 12 clubs since the 2000–01 season, the longest period without change in the history of the Scottish football league system. During this period the Scottish Premier League, and now the Scottish Premiership, has operated a "split" format, that is, split in two phases as is explained below. This is used to prevent the need for a 44-game schedule, based on playing each other four times. That format was used in the Scottish Premier Division in the mid-1980s and early 1990s, but it is now too high a number of games in a league season.

A season, which runs from August until May, is divided into two phases. During the first phase, each club plays three games against every other team, either once at home and twice away or vice versa. After this first phase of matches, by which time all clubs have played 33 games, the league splits into two halves - a 'top six' section and a 'bottom six' section. Each club plays a further five matches, one against each of the other five teams in their own section. Points achieved during the first phase of 33 matches are carried forward to the second phase, but the teams compete only within their own sections during the second phase. After the first phase is completed, clubs cannot move out of their own half in the league, even if they achieve more or fewer points than a higher or lower ranked team, respectively.

At the beginning of each season, the SPFL 'predicts' the likely positions of each club in order to produce a fixture schedule that ensures the best possible chance of all clubs playing each other twice at home and twice away. This is known as the league 'seeding' and is based on clubs' performance in the previous season. If the clubs do not finish in the half where they are predicted to finish, then anomalies can be created in the fixture list. Clubs sometimes play another three times at home and once away (or vice versa), or a club can end up playing 20 home (or away) games in a season.

Promotion and relegation
The bottom placed Premiership club at the end of the season is relegated, and swaps places with the winner of the Scottish Championship, provided that the winner satisfies Premiership entry criteria. With the creation of the SPFL, promotion and relegation play-offs involving the top flight were introduced for the first time in seventeen years. The Premiership club in eleventh place plays the Championship play-off winners over two legs, with the winner earning the right to play in the Scottish Premiership the following season. This enables two clubs to be relegated from the Premiership each season, with two being promoted. Prior to the creation of the Scottish Premiership, only a single club could be relegated each season - with only the second tier champions being promoted. The Scottish Football League had used play-offs amongst its three divisions since 2007.

European qualification

UEFA grants European places to the Scottish Football Association, determined by Scotland's position in the UEFA country coefficient rankings. The Scottish Football Association in turn allocates a number of these European places to final Scottish Premiership positions. At the end of the 2020–21 season, Scotland was ranked 11th in Europe – granting them two teams in the UEFA Champions League, one team in the UEFA Europa League, and two teams in the UEFA Europa Conference League.

At the end of the 2021–22 season, the Scottish Premiership winners (Celtic) gained qualification to the Champions League group stage, whilst the second placed team (Rangers) entered at the third qualifying round. The third placed team (Heart of Midlothian) entered the Europa League in the playoff round, while the fourth (Dundee United) and fifth (Motherwell) placed teams entered the Europa Conference League in the third and second qualifying rounds respectively.

Scotland's place in the Europa League is awarded to the winners of the Scottish Cup. Should the winners of that competition have already qualified for European competition, then the fifth placed team also enters the Europa Conference League second qualifying round, while third placed team (unless they are cup winners themselves) are promoted from Europa Conference League to the Europa League third qualifying round.

Financial disparity
The 2017 'Global Sports Salaries Survey' report found a large variation between the wages offered by teams in the Scottish Premiership, with champions Celtic paying an average annual salary of £735,040, per player, whilst traditional rivals Rangers could only pay £329,600 and league runners-up Aberdeen offered £136,382. The lowest salary offered by any of the twelve member clubs was Hamilton's £41,488 – 17 times less than Celtic, whose wages were close to the sum of the other eleven clubs combined.

The report stated that this disparity was the third-greatest from the 18 leagues surveyed, and that the Scottish Premiership offered the third-lowest salaries of those leagues; by contrast, Celtic's opponents in the Champions League that year paid average wages of £6.5m (Paris Saint-Germain) and £5.2m (Bayern Munich), seven times higher than the Scottish club.

Clubs
The 12 clubs listed below are competing in the Scottish Premiership during the 2022–23 season.

Club ranking
UEFA 5-year Club Ranking after 2021/22 season:
  33.  Rangers (50.250)
  51.  Celtic (33.000)
 136.  Aberdeen (9.000)
 161.  St Johnstone (7.380)
 162.  Hibernian (7.380)
 163.  Motherwell (7.380)
 164.  Kilmarnock (7.380)

Statistics

Championships

As of 2022, Scotland's top-flight league championship has been won 55 times by Rangers, 52 times by Celtic. Nine other clubs have won the remaining 19 championships, with three clubs tied for third place with 4 apiece. The last time the championship was won by a club other than Rangers or Celtic was in 1984–85, by Aberdeen.

Records and awards

 Biggest home win Rangers 8–0 Hamilton Academical, 8 November 2020
 Biggest away win Dundee United 0–9 Celtic, 28 August 2022
 Most goals in a game Hibernian 5–5 Rangers, 13 May 2018
 Most points in a season 106; Celtic, 2016–17
 Fewest points in a season 21; Dundee, 2018–19
 Most wins in a season 34; Celtic, 2016–17
 Fewest wins in a season 5; Dundee, 2018–19
 Most draws in a season 15, Dundee, 2015–16
 Fewest draws in a season 3, St Mirren, 2014–15
 Most defeats in a season 27, Dundee, 2018–19
 Fewest defeats in a season 0; Celtic, 2016–17; Rangers, 2020–21
 Most goals scored in a season 106; Celtic, 2016–17
 Fewest goals scored in a season 24; St Johnstone, 2021–22
 Most goals conceded in a season 78, Dundee, 2018–19
 Fewest goals conceded in a season 13; Rangers, 2020–21
 Fastest goal Kris Boyd, for Kilmarnock against Ross County, 10 seconds, 28 January 2017 
 Highest transfer fee paid Odsonne Édouard, from Paris Saint-Germain to Celtic, £9 million, 15 June 2018
 Highest transfer fee receivedKieran Tierney, from Celtic to Arsenal, £25 million, 8 August 2019
 Most hat-tricks Liam Boyce and Leigh Griffiths, 4 each
 Youngest player Dylan Reid, for St Mirren v Rangers, 16 years and 5 days, 6 March 2021
 Youngest goalscorer Jack Aitchison, for Celtic v Motherwell, 16 years and 71 days

Top scorers

 Bold shows players still playing in the Scottish Premiership.
 Italics show players still playing professional football in other leagues.

Broadcasting rights

The SPFL's domestic TV broadcast deal currently ranks 16th in Europe among European Leagues.

International

Notes

See also 

 List of association football competitions
 List of professional sports teams in the United Kingdom
 Scottish Women's Premier League

References

External links
Scottish Premiership – Official website

 
Premiership
Top level football leagues in Europe
1
2013 establishments in Scotland
Sports leagues established in 2013
Professional sports leagues in Scotland

pt:Scottish Premiership